is a professional Japanese baseball pitcher, who is a free agent. He previously played for the Yokohama DeNA BayStars.

References 

1992 births
Living people
Japanese baseball players
Nippon Professional Baseball pitchers
Yokohama DeNA BayStars players
Baseball people from Nagano Prefecture
People from Matsumoto, Nagano